Bobby Chinn is a restaurant in Hanoi, Vietnam, situated near the perimeter of the Old Quarter, overlooking Hoàn Kiếm Lake. It is run by the internationally renowned New Zealand chef Bobby Chinn. It serves a mixture of Californian, French, and Vietnamese cuisine, as well as a variety of international tapas-style dishes.

Description
New Zealand-born Chef Bobby Chinn had previously run several restaurants in Vietnam following his training in France, and his work in California. He opened his self-titled restaurant in 2000 near the Hoàn Kiếm Lake, but following increases in rent, it was moved to the Tây Hồ District of Hanoi. The interior of the restaurant features artwork from Chinn's private collection, and is divided into two dining rooms and a lounge. A further branch of the restaurant is in Ho Chi Minh City.

Menu
Reflective of the city's "increasingly cosmopolitan tastes", the restaurant serves Californian, French, and Vietnamese cuisine. This includes Chinn's variations on traditional Vietnamese cuisine, using the influences from his training in France. These include spring rolls filled with filet mignon, as well as crab cakes with a tamarind glaze on chive flowers. There is also a variety of internationally influenced tapas-style dishes, such as a Moroccan-style braised squid. One of the most well-known dishes is green-tea smoked duck, served with wasabi mashed potato.

Reception

The accolades rolled in with Restaurant Bobby Chinn earning awards for ‘Best Bar in Hanoi’ & ‘Best Fusion Restaurant’ (Vietnam Economic Times, 2002 & 2003 respectively), ‘Wine Spectator Award of Excellence’ (2004-2012) and the highly coveted Five-Diamonds Award of which Bobby Chinn was the only recipient in Vietnam at the time. Further critical acclaim came in a steady stream from international lifestyle publications including The Telegraph Luxury, The Asian Wall Street Journal, The New York Times and Time Out.

In 2010, the Vietnam Investment Review ranked Restaurant Bobby Chinn as the fifth best restaurant in Hanoi. In 2014, it was ranked as the 60th best restaurant worldwide by US website The Daily Meal.

Having swept the awards board, claiming the titles of ‘Best Bar’, ‘Best Restaurant’ and ‘Best Lounge’, the Luxe Guide created a new category solely for Restaurant Bobby Chinn, describing the experience as: “Sexy, saucy, laid back, funky, smart, casual, fun, and that's just Bobby. Inventive menu, chilled ambiance, seductive lounge-zone, great wines...”. Such kudos placed Bobby in high demand with the glitterati: he has cooked for such notable names as President Bill Clinton, Hillary Clinton and Bob Dylan, and has delivered exclusive events for APEC, The American Chamber of Commerce, FENDI and Louis Vuitton.

References

External links
Official website

Restaurants in Hanoi